The White Army or White Guard, also referred to as the Whites or White Guardsmen, was a common collective name for the armed formations of the White movement and anti-Soviet governments during the Russian Civil War. They fought against the Red Army of the Bolsheviks.

When it was created, the structure of the Russian Army of the Provisional Government period was used, while almost every individual formation had its own characteristics. The military art of the White Army was based on the experience of the First World War, which, however, left a strong imprint on the specifics of the Civil War.

History
The name "White" is associated with white symbols of the supporters of the pre-revolutionary order, dating back to the time of the French Revolution, in contrast to the name of the Red Guard detachments, and then the Red Army. For the first time, the name "White Guard" was used in Russia for Finnish police detachments created in 1906 to fight the revolutionary movement. Their members wore white bandages on their sleeves; however, this did not have a direct connection with the White Army during the Civil War.

The White armies comprised a number of different groups, who operated independently and did not share a single ideology or political goal. Their leaders were conservative or moderate generals and political leaders, each with different goals and plans to achieve them, and most of these armies did not coordinate their actions. The chain of command in each, as well as individual members, differed, from experienced veterans of World War I to fresh volunteers.

The White Guards, in addition to directly fighting with the Reds, as well as the Makhnovtsi, carried out the White Terror, while taking part in mass executions, including assisting foreign interventionists (for example, 257 civilians were killed in 1919 in the course of the struggle in the village of Ivanovka of the Japanese Army and the White Guards against the pro-Bolshevik detachments of partisans). The overall number of people killed in the White Terror is  significantly less than that in the Red Terror, which drastically differed from its counterpart due to being deliberately organized and run by Bolshevik leaders. In The Black Book of Communism, Nicolas Werth contrasts the Red and White terrors, noting the former was the official policy of the Bolshevik government:

The Bolshevik policy of terror was more systematic, better organized, and targeted at whole social classes. Moreover, it had been thought out and put into practice before the outbreak of the civil war. The White Terror was never systematized in such a fashion. It was almost invariably the work of detachments that were out of control, and taking measures not officially authorized by the military command that was attempting, without much success, to act as a government. If one discounts the pogroms, which Denikin himself condemned, the White Terror most often was a series of reprisals by the police acting as a sort of military counterespionage force. The Cheka and the Troops for the Internal Defense of the Republic were a structured and powerful instrument of repression of a completely different order, which had support at the highest level from the Bolshevik regime.

Volunteer and Don Army

After the October Revolution, the arrested generals Lavr Kornilov, Anton Denikin, Sergey Markov and others were released by Commander-in-Chief Nikolay Dukhonin before his removal and went to Don to Ataman Alexey Kaledin. The Don Region abandoned the power of the Soviets and proclaimed independence "before the formation of a nation-wide, popularly recognized government". The first white army was created by Mikhail Alekseyev, calling it the "Alekseyev Organization". Officers were recruited there on a voluntary basis. A Volunteer Army was created from the members of this organization. Generals Alexey Kaledin and Lavr Kornilov joined him. Three months later, in April 1918, the Council of Defense of the Don Host formed the Don Army. In May 1918, the Drozdov brigade joined the Volunteer Army from the Romanian Front.

Among those who came to the Don were public figures. Boris Savinkov, the former head of the SR Combat Organization, who organized the Union for the Defense of the Motherland and Freedom under the Volunteer Army, was also there. Military leaders and Cossacks reacted extremely negatively to his presence.

One of the first to join the Alekseyev Organization was Vasily Shulgin, who later became a member of the Special Meeting under Denikin.

People's Army

On 8 June 1918, the uprising white Czechs took Samara. On the same day, the People's Army was organized under the command of Colonel Nikolai Galkin. It was formed by the Committee of Members of the Constituent Assembly. On 9 June, after the arrival of Lieutenant Colonel Vladimir Kappel in the army, the following were formed: 1st Volunteer Samara Squadron, Cavalry Squadron of Staff Captain Stafievsky, Volzhskaya Equestrian Battery of Captain Vyrypayev, horse reconnaissance, subversive command and economic unit. After the formation of the units, Kappel's troops occupy Syzran and Stavropol on June 11 and 12, respectively.

On 10 July, the People's Army again entered Syzran, occupied by the Bolsheviks, and threw them back to Simbirsk. A few days later, Kappel's detachments occupied Simbirsk and from there they advanced in several directions: from Syzran to Volsk and Penza, from Simbirsk to Inza and Alatyr and along the banks of the Volga to the mouth of the Kama.

After the capture of Kazan, the People's Army was reorganized. The Volga Front was created under the command of Stanislav Chechek. It was divided into several groups: Simbirsk, Kazan, Khvalynsk, Ufa, Nikolaev, Ural Cossack troops and the Orenburg Cossack troops.

Kappel suggested the command to take Nizhny Novgorod. He suggested that the occupation of the city would break the Bolshevik plans to sign additional agreements with the Kaiser of Germany in Berlin, as he would deprive them of money from the "pocket of Russia". However, the command and the Czechs abandoned these plans, citing a lack of reserves.

Siberian Army

At the same time, in June 1918, the Provisional Siberian Government in Novo-Nikolaevsk created the Siberian Army. Initially, it was called the West Siberian Volunteer Army. From June to December 1918, the headquarters of the Siberian Army was the general headquarters for the entire White Movement of Siberia.

In August 1918, the Supreme Administration of the Northern Region in Arkhangelsk created troops of the Northern Region, sometimes referred to as the Northern Army (not to be confused with General Rodzyanko's Northern Army).

In January 1919, the Don and Volunteer Armies were combined into the Armed Forces of the South of Russia.

In June 1919, the Northern Army was created from Russian officers and soldiers of the Northern Corps, who left the Estonian army. A month later, the army was renamed the Northwest.

Unification in the Russian Army

On 14 October 1918, Minister of War Alexander Kolchak arrived in Omsk. On 18 November 1918 he was proclaimed the Supreme Ruler of Russia, who also assumed the supreme command of all the land and naval forces of Russia. He made a substantial reorganization of the forces of the White movement and carried out its integration into a single Russian Army on 23 September 1918. On 4 November Kolchak became part of the Russian Government.

As the Supreme Ruler of Russia, Admiral Kolchak is recognized by all the commanders of the white armies both in the south and west of Russia, as well as in Siberia and the Far East; generals Anton Denikin, Yevgeny Miller, Nikolai Yudenich voluntarily submit to Alexander Kolchak and recognize his Supreme High Command over all armies in Russia. The supreme commander at the same time confirms the authority of the commanders. From this moment, the Armed Forces of the South of Russia, the Northwestern Army, the Northern Army, and the Eastern Front have been operating on the fronts of this single army.

The name "Russian Army" is approved as the union of all white fronts, the status of commanders of the fronts formally from the Supreme Commander-in-Chief is received by the commanders of the North and Northwest Armies Generals Yudenich and Miller. In April 1920, the Far Eastern Army was created in Transbaikalia from the remnants of the troops of the Eastern Front under the leadership of General Grigory Semenov.

Out of the remnants of the Armed Forces of the South of Russia that left for Crimea in May 1920, General Wrangel formed the armed forces that inherited the name "Russian Army" from the single Russian army of the Supreme Commander-in-Chief Admiral Kolchak of 1919 – as the last of its fronts.

In 1921, from the remnants of the Far Eastern Army of General Semyonov in Primorye, the White Rebel Army was formed, later renamed the Zemsky Army, since the Amur Zemsky Government was created in Vladivostok in 1922.

Composition
White armies drew both from volunteers and on the basis of mobilization.

On a voluntary basis, they were staffed not only from officers of the Russian Imperial Army and Navy, but also from all comers. It was both in the South – in the Volunteer Army, and in Siberia, for example – the division of the Labor Corps.

On a mobilization basis, they drew from the population of controlled territories and from captured Red Army soldiers.

The strength of the white armies fighting against the Red Army, according to intelligence estimates, by June 1919 was about 683,000. However, together with auxiliary and staff units, it could exceed 1,023,000 people. A significant part of the white forces was on contentment. Combat units amounted to only half of this figure. After that, the number of white armies began to decline steadily.

The White Army consisted of all kinds of troops for that period:
Air Units;
Cavalry;
Infantry;
Railway connections.
Tank Units;

All of them had their own uniforms and insignia, often copied from the uniform of the guard units of the Russian Imperial Army.

According to supporters of the White movement, the White Guard is a military man devoted to his ideals (even though the officer, though the ordinary), who was ready to defend his Motherland and his specific ideas about duty, honour and justice with arms in hand.

See also
Russian All-Military Union
Russian State (1918–1920)
White Army, Black Baron

Notes

References

Sources

External links

Anti-communist organizations
White movement